John Davison Rockefeller III (March 21, 1906 – July 10, 1978) was an American philanthropist. Rockefeller was the eldest son and second child of John D. Rockefeller Jr. and Abby Aldrich Rockefeller as well as a grandson of Standard Oil co-founder John D. Rockefeller. He was engaged in a wide range of philanthropic projects, many of which his family had launched, as well as supporting organizations related to East Asian affairs. Rockefeller was also a major supporter of the Population Council, and the committee that created the Lincoln Center in Manhattan.

Early life
On March 21, 1906, John Davison Rockefeller III was born in New York City, New York. His parents were John Davison Rockefeller Jr. (1874–1960) and Abigail Greene "Abby" Aldrich (1874–1948), philanthropists.  He had four younger brothers, Nelson, Winthrop, Laurance and David, and an elder sister, Abby. Through his father, he was a grandson of Standard Oil co-founder John Davison Rockefeller Sr. and schoolteacher Laura Celestia "Cettie" Spelman. Through his mother, he was a grandson of Senator Nelson Wilmarth Aldrich and Abigail Pearce Truman "Abby" Chapman. He received his preparatory education at the Browning School in New York City and the Loomis Chaffee School, Windsor, Connecticut, in 1925. He went to Princeton University where he received high honors in economics and graduated in 1929 with the degree of Bachelor of Science, choosing industrial relations as the subject of his senior thesis. His interest in industrial relations stemmed from the family's role in the Ludlow Massacre, in which strikebreakers and security guards killed women and children of miners striking against the Rockefeller-controlled Colorado Fuel and Iron Company. Rockefeller's father worked to restore the family's public reputation by championing industrial relations and the work of William Lyon Mackenzie King, a pioneer in the field.

Commencing a lifelong commitment to international relations, he undertook a world tour after graduating from college, which concluded with assignments for the Institute of Pacific Relations conference in Japan.

Institutional positions/activities
John III was the next Rockefeller manager for all family undertakings of social relevance. Since 1929, in total he sat on twenty boards of various institutions, most of which were family-related. The more notable of these were:
Rockefeller University - then the Rockefeller Institute for Medical Research (established by Senior);
Colonial Williamsburg (John Jr., Abby);
Riverside Church (John Jr.);
International House of New York (John Jr.);
General Education Board - later the International Education Board (Senior);
China Medical Board (John Sr., John Jr.);
Bureau of Social Hygiene (John Jr.);
Industrial Relations Counselors (John Jr.).

John III was at one time a member of the Council on Foreign Relations, the Foreign Policy Association and the Institute of Pacific Relations, as well as being on the board of directors of Princeton University. In late 1950, he accompanied secretary of state John Foster Dulles and Douglas MacArthur on a trip to Japan to conclude a peace treaty, during which time he consulted with many Japanese leaders in practically every important sphere of that country's life.

He was a prominent third-generation family philanthropist in his own right and founder of the Asia Society, the major institution he established in 1956 to foster greater cooperation between Asia and the United States. He also founded the Population Council in 1952, and a reconstituted Japan Society. In addition, he set up the United Negro College Fund for the ongoing education of African Americans, carrying on the family tradition in this area with his grandfather's funding of the education of black women at Spelman College in Atlanta.

He was on his father's Advisory Committee in the family office, Room 5600. He was also president of the family's principal philanthropy run by family members, the Rockefeller Brothers Fund, from its inception in 1940 to 1956. In 1929, he joined the family's renowned Rockefeller Foundation; elected to the board in 1931 he subsequently became chairman of this major philanthropic organization for twenty years and was responsible for changing the focus of the institution.

The principal philanthropic institution he created was the JDR III Fund in 1963, its major program being the Asian Cultural Program, created in 1967 to encourage East-West cultural exchange. The Fund was wound-up upon his death in 1979, but the Cultural Program continued as the Asian Cultural Council, which has provided grant assistance to more than 4,000 Asians and Americans in the area of the arts. Funding for its programs is derived from a combination of endowment income and contributions from individuals, foundations and corporations in the United States and Asia.  	  	

In the mid-1950s, John III assumed the leadership of the Exploratory Committee for a Musical Arts Center, a committee of civic leaders who were working to create what would become Lincoln Center. He was the key figure in the fund-raising efforts and in forging a consensus among the civic leaders and others who were essential to its success. The Center itself was built over a period from 1959 to 1969. He was its first president, commencing in 1956, and he became its chairman in 1961. He was chairman until 1970 when he was duly elected honorary chairman.

In the late 1960s, Rockefeller III was responsible for the creation of the Commission on Foundations and Private Philanthropy (usually known as the Peterson Commission, headed by Peter G. Peterson) and the Commission on Private Philanthropy and Public Needs (usually known as the Filer Commission). He established the Rockefeller Public Service Awards in 1958. In 1959, he received The Hundred Year Association of New York's Gold Medal Award "in recognition of outstanding contributions to the City of New York". In 1976, he received the S. Roger Horchow Award for Greatest Public Service by a Private Citizen, an award given out annually by Jefferson Awards. 

Rockefeller III was chairman of the Commission on Population Growth and the American Future, which was created to provide recommendations to the United States government regarding population growth and its social consequences. The Commission was established by Congress in 1970 and submitted its final recommendations in 1972.

Posthumous honors
Rockefeller College at Princeton University was named in his honor in 1982.

The John D. Rockefeller III National Tournament of Elementary School State Champions, an annual national-championship chess tournament run by US Chess, was named in his honor in 2020.

Personal life
On November 11, 1932, he married the socially connected Blanchette Ferry Hooker (1909–1992), who was to serve as chairman of the Asian Cultural Council from 1980 to 1990, and who established the Blanchette H. Rockefeller Fellowship Fund, in Japan. They had one son and three daughters:

Sandra Ferry Rockefeller
John Davison "Jay" Rockefeller IV - a former U.S. Senator from West Virginia and a former two-term governor of that state
Hope Aldrich Rockefeller
Alida Ferry Rockefeller

Death
Rockefeller was killed in an automobile accident in Mount Pleasant, New York, (near the Rockefeller family estate in Pocantico), on July 10, 1978, at the age of 72. He was buried at the Rockefeller Family Cemetery in Sleepy Hollow, New York.

See also
 Rockefeller family
 Rockefeller Foundation
 Rockefeller University
 Rockefeller Brothers Fund

References

Further reading
Hall, Peter Dobkin. Inventing the Nonprofit Sector and Other Essays on Philanthropy, Voluntarism, and Nonprofit Organizations. Baltimore: Johns Hopkins University Press, 1992.
Harr, John Ensor, and Peter J. Johnson. The Rockefeller Century: Three Generations of America's Greatest Family. New York: Charles Scribner's Sons, 1988. .
Harr, John Ensor, and Peter J. Johnson. The Rockefeller Conscience: An American Family in Public and in Private. New York: Charles Scribner's Sons, 1991. .
Marcus, George E., & Hall, Peter Dobkin. Lives in Trust: The Fortunes of Dynastic Families in Late Twentieth Century America. Boulder: Westview Press, 1992.
Rockefeller, David. Memoirs. New York: Random House, 2002. .
Young, Edgar B. Lincoln Center: The Building of an Institution''. New York: New York University Press, 1980.

External links
Rockefeller Archive Center: Selected Biography
John D Rockefeller 3rd papers at the Rockefeller Archive Center.
Rockefeller Brothers Fund website
FBI Records: The Vault - John D. Rockefeller III at fbi.gov
 Asia Society - founded by Rockefeller.

Rockefeller family
Rockefeller Foundation people
Winthrop family
American philanthropists
1906 births
1978 deaths
Princeton University alumni
American people of English descent
American people of German descent
American people of Scotch-Irish descent
Road incident deaths in New York (state)
Loomis Chaffee School alumni
Browning School alumni
Special Tony Award recipients
Presidents of the Population Council